Sillane (possibly from Aymara silla cane of maize, -ni a suffix, "the one with  canes of maize") is a mountain in the Chila mountain range in the Andes of Peru which reaches a height of approximately . It is located in the Arequipa Region, Caylloma Province, on the border of the districts of Madrigal and Tapay. Sillane lies north of the Colca River, northeast of the village of Tapay.

References 

Mountains of Peru
Mountains of Arequipa Region